2A or II-A may refer to:
 Alberta Highway 2A
 Alpha-2A adrenergic receptor
 Keratin 2A
 Massachusetts Route 2A
 Stalag II-A
 Telecom 2A, a satellite
 the transcription factor II A
 the Deutsche Bahn IATA designator
Second Amendment of various constitutions
 the Second Amendment to the United States Constitution that protects right to keep and bear arms
 the number of the French department Corse-du-Sud
 a strain of the bacterium Lactobacillus sakei
 2A self-cleaving peptides

See also 
 A2 (disambiguation)
 IIA (disambiguation)